Pak Elektron Limited (PEL) is a Pakistani engineering corporation which manufactures major home appliances and electrical equipment.

PEL operates in two segments - power and appliances. The former includes manufacturing of transformers, grid stations and energy meters among other goods, while the latter division deals in making, assembling and distribution of home appliances like refrigerators and air conditioner.

History
PEL was founded in 1956 through a technical collaboration with AEG. In 1978, PEL was acquired by Saigol Group and was taken public a decade later. Over the years, PEL has formed alliances with several international giants, including General Electric, Fujitsu, and Hitachi. The company also became the sole distributor of LG Corporation's home appliances in 2009.

In 2020, PEL became a distributor of Panasonic products in Pakistan.

Appliances Division
PEL’s Appliances Division is the flag carrier of the Saigol Group involved in home appliances manufacturing.

PEL Air 
PEL window-type air conditioners were introduced in 1981 in technical collaboration with General Corporation of Japan. Ever since their launch, PEL air conditioners have a leading position in the market. Recognizing the shift in consumers' preference from window-type to split-type air conditioners, PEL has focused its manufacturing efforts on split-type air conditioners.

PEL Refrigerators
The manufacturing of refrigerators started in 1986-87 in technical collaboration with M/s IAR-SILTAL of Italy. Like air conditioners, PEL's refrigerators are also in great demand. Today, PEL Crystal has 30% market share across Pakistan.

PEL Deep Freezers
PEL deep freezer was introduced in 1987 in technical collaboration with M/s Ariston Thermo of Italy.

Power Division
PEL's Power Division consists of three main products:
 Energy meters
 Transformers
 Switchgears

References

External links
 Pak Electron Limited

Saigol Group
Manufacturing companies established in 1956
Consumer electronics brands
Electronics companies of Pakistan
Electrical engineering companies of Pakistan
Home appliance manufacturers of Pakistan
Companies listed on the Pakistan Stock Exchange
Pakistani brands
Electric transformer manufacturers
1978 mergers and acquisitions
Pakistani companies established in 1956